Mohammad Akbar Hossain is Lieutenant General of Bangladesh Army and incumbent commandant of National Defence College.

Career 
Hossain is the former GOC of 9th Infantry Division and commander of Savar area. He previously served as Director General of Directorate General of Forces Intelligence. He also served as Director of Counter Intelligence Bureau of Directorate General of Forces Intelligence. He previously Commanded a Artillery Brigade and a Air Defence Artillery Brigade. He was an artillery officer who was commissioned in the 13th BMA long course on 20 December 1985 from Bangladesh Military Academy. Under him a new monogram of DGFI was designed. He is the 1st Colonel Commandant of Remount Veterinary and Farm Corps(RV&FC). He adorned Colonel Commandant rank badge of this prestigious appointment ceremony held at RV&FC depot at Savar Cantonment in December 2020.

References

Living people
Bangladeshi military personnel
Bangladesh Army generals
Bangladeshi generals
Directors General of the Directorate General of Forces Intelligence
1965 births